The Santarém Football Association (Associação de Futebol de Santarém, abrv. AF Santarém) is the district governing body for the all football competitions in the Portuguese district of Santarém. It is also the regulator of the clubs registered in the district.

Notable clubs in the Santarém FA
 U.F.C.I. Tomar
 C.D. Fátima
 G.D.R. Monsanto
 Torres Novas

Current Divisions - 2011–12 Season
The AF Santarém runs the following division covering the fifth and sixth tiers of the Portuguese football league system.

Honra

Associação Desportiva Cidade Ferroviária do Entroncamento
Associação Desportiva de Mação
Associação Desportiva Fazendense
Associação Recreativa de Porto Alto
Atlético Clube Alcanenense
Centro de Cultura Recreio e Desporto Moçarriense
Clube Atlético Ouriense
Clube Desportivo Amiense
Clube Desportivo de Torres Novas
Estrela Futebol Clube Ouriquense
Grupo Desportivo Benavente
U.F.C.I. Tomar

2ª divisão – série A

Associação Desportiva Recreativa e Cultural Vasco da Gama
Centro de Cultura e Desporto de Caxarias
Centro Desportivo Social Cultural do Cercal - Vale do Ninho
Centro Recreativo e Cultural de Santo António de Assentis
Clube Desportivo e Recreativo de Alferrarede "Os Dragões"
Grupo Desportivo da Casa do Povo de Pego
Sport Clube Ferreira do Zézere
União Desportiva Abrantina
União Desportiva Atalaiense
Vitória Futebol Clube Mindense
União Futebol Comércio e Indústria de Tomar

2ª divisão – série B

Clube Desportivo Salvaterrense
Futebol Clube Goleganense
Grupo de Futebol dos Empregados no Comércio
Grupo Desportivo de Samora Correia
Grupo Desportivo O Coruchense
Grupo Desportivo Pontével
Sport Clube Barrosense
Sport Clube de Desportos de Glória do Ribatejo
União Desportiva da Chamusca
União Futebol Clube de Almeirim

See also
 Portuguese District Football Associations
 Portuguese football competitions
 List of football clubs in Portugal

References 

Portuguese District Football Associations